Ije Awele is a 2022 Nigerian drama film directed by Emeka Ojukwu and executive produced by Emeka Nwokocha. It stars Victoria Nwogu, Onyeka Onwenu, Jide-Kene Achufusi, Seun Ajayi, Keppy Ekpeyong, Ngozi Nwosu, Ejike Asiegbu and Esther Uzodinma. It is a story about an abuse survivor molested by her father, she finds out in her later years that her mother has known all the while and has been giving her contraceptives, covering up for her father in order to save the family name. This leaves her feeling betrayed, even when she finds love.

Cast 

 Victoria Nwogu as Awele
 Onyeka Onwenu as Ijeoma Okpara
 Jide-Kene Achufusi as Dubem/Dubar
 Seun Ajayi as Kunle
 Keppy Ekpenyong as Obinna Okpara
 Ngozi Nwosu as Iya Olumide
 Ejike Asiegbu as Chief Ide Na Mba
 Esther Uzodinma as Uju
 Angela Eguavoen as Osas
 Leo Orji as Mr. Simdi
 James Jibunma Ebuka
 Victoria Akomas Ego
 Emeka Golden Yoyo

References

2020s drama films
English-language Nigerian films
2022 drama films
Nigerian coming-of-age films
2020s English-language films